Gay Lynn Bennion is an American politician serving as a member of the Utah House of Representatives from the 46th district. Elected in November 2020, she assumed office on January 1, 2021.

Early life and education 
Bennion was born in Salt Lake City and raised in Holladay, Utah. She earned a Bachelor of Arts degree in English from Brigham Young University.

Career 
Bennion has worked as a volunteer teacher. Since 2013, she has been the education director of the Women's State Legislative Council of Utah. She was elected to the Utah House of Representatives in November 2020, defeating Republican Jaren Davis with nearly 57% of the vote.  She assumed office on January 1, 2021, succeeding Marie Poulson.

Personal life 
After graduating from college, Bennion's husband, Jim, enlisted in the United States Air Force. The couple then moved to Washington, D.C., where Bennion worked at a mortgage firm while her husband attended medical school. Bennion's family lived in Oklahoma, Michigan, and Georgia before returning to Utah in 2012. Bennion and her husband have four children. She is a member of the Church of Jesus Christ of Latter-day Saints.

References 

 

Living people
People from Salt Lake City
Politicians from Salt Lake City
People from Holladay, Utah
Brigham Young University alumni
Women state legislators in Utah
Democratic Party members of the Utah House of Representatives
21st-century American politicians
21st-century American women politicians
Year of birth missing (living people)